Chocolate salami is an Italian and Portuguese dessert made from cocoa, broken biscuits, butter, eggs and sometimes alcohol such as port wine or rum. The dessert became popular across Europe and elsewhere, often losing alcohol as an ingredient along the way.

Chocolate salami is not a meat product. The appellation "salami" stems from physical resemblance. Like salami, chocolate salami is formed as a long cylinder and is sliced across into discs for serving. These discs are a brown, chocolaty matrix (like the red meat of salami) peppered with bright bits of cookie (like the white flecks of fat in salami). Some varieties also contain chopped nuts, such as almonds or hazelnuts and may be shaped like truffles.

International variations

Asia 

Europe 

In Cyprus, it is known as Doukissa (Duchess cake).

In Estonia, it is known as “Kirjukoer” (colourful dog).

In Germany, it is known as Kalte Schnauze (cold snout) or Kalter Hund (cold dog). 

In Italy, it is also called  (chocolate salami) or, especially in Sicily,  (Turkish salami).

In Lithuania, a similar dessert is called , which is made out of cocoa, broken biscuits, condensed milk and butter, and sometimes nuts, however alternative recipes exist under the same name of the dish.

In the Netherlands, a similar dessert is called .

In Poland, a similar dessert is called  (chocolate block).

In Portugal, it is called  (chocolate salami), and is typically made using Marie biscuit.

In Romania, it is called  (biscuit salami), and it may have originated during the 1970s or 1980s in the communist era, possibly as a result of food shortages.

In Russia, it is called  (meaning chocolate sausage) and made with walnut.

In Turkey, it is called  (mosaic cake).

South America 

It is usually made similarly to brigadeiro, with biscuit chunks inside.

In Uruguay, it is called  (chocolate sausage).

See also
 
 Uncooked variants of chocolate salami, such as:
 Hedgehog slice, from German cuisine
 Batik cake, from Malaysian cuisine
 Tiffin, from Scottish cuisine
 Chocolate biscuit pudding, from Sri Lankan cuisine

References

Chocolate desserts
Italian desserts
Portuguese desserts